Jennifer is a 1978 American supernatural horror film directed by Brice Mack, starring Lisa Pelikan, Bert Convy, Wesley Eure, Nina Foch, and John Gavin. Its plot follows a young woman who, ostracized by her peers at an elite boarding school, enacts violent revenge via her psychokinetic ability to control snakes.

Plot
Jennifer Baylor is a poor young woman from West Virginia who possesses a supernatural power over snakes, an ability to control them and communicate with them. She and her father, Luke, left their home in disgrace, because when Jennifer was 7 years old, some snakes she had been handling killed the town preacher's son. She refused to handle snakes ever again, though Luke now runs a pet store in California and often encourages her to use her power again. Luke is mentally disabled and obsessed with the Bible, is unable to make meals for himself without burning them, and relies on Jennifer to care for him.

Jennifer studies on a scholarship at the elite Green View School, where she is an outcast among her wealthy peers, all of whom are from prominent families, and who are largely protected by the school's headmistress, the imperious, pill-addicted Mrs. Calley. Her only real friends are the school's lunch lady, Martha, with whom Jennifer works to help supplement her tuition, and teacher Jeff Reed, the only teacher who sees the corruption in the school for what it truly is. Jennifer becomes an unwitting target for Sandra Tremayne, an entitled bully, when Jennifer exposes that Sandra stole the answers to an exam. Sandra evades legitimate consequences when her father, a U.S. senator, makes a large donation to the school, but Jennifer nevertheless becomes subject to numerous pranks and harassment from Sandra and her friends. Sandra hopes her torment will drive Jennifer to leave the school. Soon, Jane, an overweight student on the fringe of Sandra's social group, protests Sandra's excessive cruelty toward Jennifer, risking her alliance with Sandra.

One afternoon, after Jennifer finishes her job in the cafeteria, she takes a shower in the empty gymnasium locker room. Upon exiting the shower, she finds that Sandra and her friends have stolen her clothing and belongings and hung them on pipes in the pool room. When Jennifer climbs a ladder to retrieve them, Sandra's boyfriend Dayton startles her by taking photographs with a flashbulb camera, causing her to fall naked into the pool. Dayton subsequently corners Jane in an elevator, and aware of the fact that Jane is attracted to him, rapes her.

Some time later, Jennifer is horrified to find that Sandra has purchased a beloved kitten from Jennifer's father's pet store, killed it, and hung it inside Jennifer's locker. That night, Jennifer finally decides to again exercise her power over snakes, invoking them in the pet store. A notable shift in her personality follows, and she coolly confronts Jane about Sandra's murdering the kitten. Jane agrees to an alliance with Jennifer, seeking retaliation against Dayton.

As a culmination to their tormenting Jennifer, Sandra and her friends stage a kidnapping in which they abduct Jennifer from her home in the middle of the night. A reluctant Jane becomes embroiled in the plan, and watches as Dayton places Jennifer, bound and gagged, in the trunk of Sandra's car. With Dayton and her other friends following behind, Sandra drives into an empty parking garage. On the roof, they remove Jennifer from the trunk and torment her by driving their cars in circles around her. Unbeknownst to them, Jennifer invokes a multitude of snakes ranging in various sizes that descend on the scene, attacking all of her tormentors by strangling and biting them. Dayton is thrown off the parking garage to his death, and Sandra attempts to flee in her car, but Jennifer manifests a giant snake that causes her to crash the vehicle and die in a fire.

Later in her office, Mrs. Calley threatens and blames Jennifer for the mysterious event, which has left six Green View students hospitalized, but there is no evidence proving Jennifer's guilt, and the witnesses have no memory of what occurred. After dismissing Jennifer, Mrs. Calley is attacked and killed by a snake she discovers in her desk drawer. Jennifer and Jane hear her screams as they exit the school, and both respond with laughter.

Cast

Production
Principal photography of Jennifer began on November 21, 1977 in Los Angeles, California.

Release
Jennifer opened theatrically on April 21, 1978. It subsequently had its New York City premiere on May 13, and its Los Angeles premiere on September 13.

Critical response
Janet Maslin of The New York Times wrote that "all things considered, Jennifer could be a whole lot worse", and noted that "while Miss Pelikan is not Sissy Spacek by a long shot, she does have a suitably spooky look in her eye". TV Guide called the film a "blatant Carrie rip-off".

Bob Keaton of the Fort Lauderdale News also noted the film's similarities to Carrie, but praised Pelikan's performance as terrific.

Home media
The film was released on DVD and Blu-ray by Kino Lorber on October 14, 2014.

See also
 List of killer snake films
 Mystics in Bali
 Jaws of Satan

References

External links
 
 
 
 
 

1978 films
American International Pictures films
1978 horror films
American teen horror films
1970s teen horror films
Films set in boarding schools
Films about bullying
American films about revenge
Films about snakes
Films directed by Brice Mack
Films produced by Steve Krantz
Films shot in Los Angeles
American supernatural thriller films
1970s English-language films
1970s American films